DGK may refer to:
 Danganronpa Kirigiri, a 2013 light novel series
 Danganronpa Gaiden: Killer Killer, a 2016 manga series
 Danganronpa: Killing Harmony, a 2017 visual novel video game
 Deutsche Gesellschaft für Kardiologie (in English: German Cardiac Society)
 German Crystallographic Society (in German: Deutsche Gesellschaft für Kristallographie)
 Dera Ghazi Khan, a city in central Pakistan
 Diacylglycerol kinase, an integral membrane protein
 DGK Skateboards